Corbița is a commune located in Vrancea County, Romania. It is composed of nine villages: Buda, Corbița, Izvoarele, Lărgășeni, Ocheșești, Rădăcinești, Șerbănești (the commune center), Tuțu and Vâlcelele.

References

Communes in Vrancea County
Localities in Western Moldavia